Platensina alboapicalis is a species of tephritid or fruit flies in the genus Platensina of the family Tephritidae.

Distribution
Myanmar.

References

Tephritinae
Insects described in 1938
Diptera of Asia